Albert Félix Joseph Renaud (1855 – 28 May 1924) was a French organist and composer who served for many years as organist at the parish church of Saint-Germain-en-Laye, near Paris.

Life and career

Born in the 6th arrondissement of Paris, Renaud studied at the Conservatoire de Paris under César Franck, Camille Saint-Saens, Charles Gounod and Jules Massenet and began his career by succeeding his father Félix as choirmaster of the Church of Saint-Sulpice in Paris.

After a spell as organist at Rennes Cathedral, he returned to Paris in 1878 as organist of the Church of Saint-François-Xavier. In 1891 he became organist at the parish church of Saint-Germain-en-Laye, serving until his death. In 1903 he oversaw the refurbishment of the church's Cavaillé-Coll organ, marking the completion of the work with a concert on 27 October at which Alexandre Guilmant and Eugène Gigout also played.

His successor at Saint-Germain-en-Laye was Albert Alain, father of organists Jehan, Olivier and Marie-Claire Alain.

Compositions
Renaud's best known work is his Toccata in D minor (Op. 108, No. 1), which he dedicated to Alexandre Guilmant. Guilmant played it during a recital at the St. Louis World's Fair in 1904. He also wrote piano, orchestral and choral works as well as opera and ballet music.

List of works
For organ
 Quatre pièces d'orgue (Op. 101, No. 1 (Entrée, processional), No. 2 (Angelus), No. 3 (Pastorale) and No. 4 (Marche funèbre))
 Improvisations - soixante pièces classées par tons pour orgue ou harmonium (Op. 106)
 Deux toccatas (Op. 108, No. 1 (in D minor) and No. 2 (in D major))
 Quatre pièces d'orgue (Op. 116, including No. 1 (Offertoire in E minor) and No. 3 (Communion in F major))
 Esquisses - trente pièces pour orgue ou harmonium (Op. 120)
 Grand choeur, Op. 123 (No. 1 in D major)

Opera
 Le petit chaperon rouge (1885)

Ballet
 Roknedin (1892)

Other
 Un voyage à Venise (1896)

References

External links

1855 births
1924 deaths
19th-century French composers
19th-century organists
20th-century French composers
20th-century organists
Conservatoire de Paris alumni
French classical organists
French male organists
French choral conductors
People from Saint-Germain-en-Laye
Male classical organists